Kamadhenu may refer to:

 Kamadhenu, the divine cow in Hindu mythology.
 Kamadhenu (Dharwad), a village in the southern state of Karnataka, India
 Kamadhenu (film), Indian Tamil film
 Kamadenu, a weekly Tamil magazine